This page shows aggregate tables and attendance averages for the 2006/07 season of Royal League.

Results table by country

Results table by club

Average attendances by country

Average attendances by club

See also 

 All-time Royal League statistics

statistics
2006–07